Robin Scott may refer to:

 Robin Scott (singer), British musician best known for his releases as M
 Robin Scott (BBC controller) (1920–2000), BBC radio and television controller
 Robin Scott (Victorian politician) (Robin David Scott, born 1973), member of the Victorian Legislative Assembly
 Robin Scott (Western Australian politician) (Robin David Scott), member of the Western Australian Legislative Council
 Robin Wilson (author) (born 1928), American science fiction author who writes under the pen name Robin Scott